Rapid River is an unincorporated community in Masonville Township, Delta County in the U.S. state of Michigan.

It is situated on the northern end of the Little Bay de Noc between the mouths of the Tacoosh and Rapid rivers with the mouth of the Whitefish River just to the east. U.S. Highway 2 (US 2) passes through Rapid River and joins with US 41 just west of town; the two then run concurrently from Rapid River south to Escanaba. The Rapid River ZIP code is 49878 and also serves areas in the nearby townships in Delta County of Baldwin, Bay de Noc, Brampton, Ensign, Garden, Maple Ridge, Masonville, and Nahma. It also serves a small area in Mathias Township in Alger County

The community was first named Rapid Siding as a stop on the Minneapolis, St. Paul and Sault Ste. Marie Railroad, and subsequently renamed for the nearby river. The name was recorded as Rapid River when the community was platted in 1887. The community never incorporated as a village.

One scene from the 2001 film Escanaba in da Moonlight was shot in the Swallow Inn, a bar in Rapid River.

Public schools in Rapid River are administered by the Rapid River Schools, the area's school district. The high school's athletic teams are known as the "Rockets". The school's 8-man varsity football team won Division 2 of the Michigan State Championship in 2018.

Fire coverage is provided by the Masonville Township Volunteer Fire Department and Ensign Township Volunteer Fire Department. Emergency Medical Services are provided by the Masonville Township Volunteer EMS service which provide non-transport Basic Life Support services.

Indian Trails provides daily intercity bus service between St. Ignace and Ironwood, Michigan.

Demographics

References

External links
 

Census-designated places in Michigan
Census-designated places in Delta County, Michigan
Unincorporated communities in Michigan
Unincorporated communities in Delta County, Michigan
Company towns in Michigan
Populated places established in 1887